Raymond Donald Pruitt (February 6, 1912 - January 14, 1993) was an American physician specializing in cardiology who was the founding dean of the Mayo Medical School. An alumnus of Baker University, he received his medical degree from the University of Kansas and was also a Rhodes Scholar at the University of Oxford.

References

1912 births
1993 deaths
American Rhodes Scholars
University of Kansas alumni
Baker University alumni
American cardiologists
Mayo Clinic people
Physicians of the Mayo Clinic